Roachville is a former small mining settlement, now in Inyo County, California. It was founded in 1861 on the east slope of the White Mountains, at the lower reaches of Cottonwood Creek northwest of White Mountain City.

History 
Roachville and White Mountain City, settlements east of the White Mountains from Owens Valley, were used for a California election fraud in the fall of 1861. The Warm Springs precinct covering these sparsely populated settlements was populated with an additional 521 voters culled from the passenger list of a steamship that had recently arrived in San Francisco.

Location
The site of Roachville is on Cottonwood Creek, northeast of White Mountain City near the Mono County, California border.

References

Former settlements in Inyo County, California
Populated places established in 1861
Ghost towns in Inyo County, California
1861 establishments in California